Farkhod Turayev (born 14 June 1974) is a Uzbekistani judoka. He competed in the men's half-middleweight event at the 2000 Summer Olympics.

References

1974 births
Living people
Uzbekistani male judoka
Olympic judoka of Uzbekistan
Judoka at the 2000 Summer Olympics
Place of birth missing (living people)
Asian Games medalists in judo
Judoka at the 1998 Asian Games
Judoka at the 2002 Asian Games
Asian Games bronze medalists for Uzbekistan
Medalists at the 2002 Asian Games
20th-century Uzbekistani people
21st-century Uzbekistani people